Nicholas, Prince of Montenegro (Serbian Cyrillic: Никола Петровић-Његош; born 7 July 1944) is a French-born architect and the Head of the House of Petrović-Njegoš, which reigned over Montenegro from 1696 to 1766 and again from 1782 to 1918.

He lives in Montenegro and occupies part of the former royal palace and the historic family home in Njeguši. In 2011 the country recognised an official role for the Royal House of Petrović-Njegoš: to promote Montenegrin identity, culture, and traditions through cultural, humanitarian and other non-political activities.

Family background

The house of Petrović came originally from Herzegovina and settled in Njeguši around 1400. Niegosch was born around 1425 and became the Voivode of Njegoš.

Nicholas descends from Danilo Petrović-Njegoš who obtained the hereditary Dignity of Vladika (Prince-Bishop) of Montenegro in 1711 when it became a theocracy. Danilo I Petrović-Njegoš was recognized as Sovereign Prince of Montenegro by Russia on 21 March 1852, and established succession by male primogeniture. His successor, Prince Nikola I assumed the style of Royal Highness on 19 December 1900, and the title of King 28 August 1910.

Nicholas is also related to the former royal House of Obrenović through Jevrem, younger full brother of Miloš Obrenović I, Prince of Serbia.

During World War I the Petrović Njegoš family were forced to flee the country in 1915 after the Army of Montenegro was overwhelmed by the troops of the Austro-Hungarian Empire. At the end of the war, territories of Montenegro joined the Kingdom of Serbia, while the Podgorica People's Assembly abolished the Kingdom of Montenegro and deposing the Petrović Njegoš dynasty.

The family gained the French citizenship as they made their home in France where Nikola I of Montenegro died in exile in 1921. The same year, King Nikola's maternal grandson, Alexandar Karađorđević (Prince Nikola I's cousin) became king of the Kingdom of Serbs, Croats and Slovenes, of which Montenegro had become a part. Though the Kingdom of the Serbs, Croats and Slovenes was proclaimed on 13 November 1918, it was never recognized by Nikola I, who maintained a government-in-exile, which was headed by the ex-king's former aide-de-camp and ambassador to Washington, General Anto Gvozdenović, until the Conference of Ambassadors at Paris gave international recognition to the union 13 July 1922.

Nicholas I's heir at death was his eldest son, Crown Prince Danilo (titular King Danilo II), who "abdicated" after one week, recognising his cousin's reign over Serbia (including the territories of Montenegro) and Yugoslavia. Family's dynastic claim was taken up by his grandson, Michael, Prince of Montenegro, the titular King Mihajlo I, who was the father of Prince Nikola II and died in exile in 1986.

Early life
Nicholas was born in Saint-Nicolas-du-Pélem at the house of a maternal great aunt in France as the only son and heir of Michael, Prince of Montenegro and his wife Geneviève, Princess  of Montenegro, née Prigent (1919–1990), a member of the French resistance. Prince Michael was internationally recognised as Montenegro's king-in-exile under a regency headed by his grandmother Queen Milena from 7 March 1921 until 13 July 1922 when international recognition was given for the 1918 annexation of Montenegro by the new Serbian headed kingdom of Serbs, Croats and Slovenes. Prince Nicholas' parents were married on 27 January 1941 in Paris.

Nicholas was initially baptised Catholic by his mother, before his father had him re-baptised Orthodox. Nicholas has stated he feels close to both religions. His parents divorced in Paris, France, on 11 August 1949, exactly 5 weeks after his 5th birthday. Geneviève received custody of the young Nicholas and raised him largely as a single mother. Growing up in France, Nicholas barely saw his father and knew very little about Montenegro or his family's history being raised and educated as a Frenchman.

In 1967 while a student he visited Montenegro for the first time, upon showing his university ID card the staff bowed upon recognising the Petrović-Njegoš name. News of his visit had spread and by the time he left the museum a crowd of 300 Montenegrins had gathered to greet him.

Head of the royal house
Nicholas succeeded as head of the House of Petrović-Njegoš on the death of his father in 1986 and grew closer to his Montenegrin heritage. In 1989 he received an official invitation to come to Montenegro for the reburial and state funeral of his great grandparents King Nicholas I of Montenegro and Queen Milena and their two daughters, Princess Vera and Princess Xenia. Nicholas accompanied the remains on an Italian battleship and his family received an enthusiastic welcome from Montenegrians.

During the breakup of Yugoslavia, Nicholas made several statements calling on Montenegrians not to get caught up in the violence.

Nicholas was an active participant in the campaign for the restoration of Montenegro's independence, preceding the referendum on the separation of the former kingdom from the provisional State Union of Serbia and Montenegro. 

Nicholas chose not to attend the celebrations of the centenary of the Kingdom of Montenegro that were held on 28 August 2010. Instead, he celebrated in private.

Legislation passed in 2011 provides Nicholas with a monthly stipend equal to that of the President, and grants his family residences in Cetinje and Podgorica, the Petrović Njegoš historic family home in Njeguši, and use of the first floor of the former royal palace. The Montenegrin state also promised to pay €4.3 million to a charitable foundation administered by the family.

Marriage and children
On 27 November 1976 in Trébeurden, Côtes-du-Nord, he married Francine Navarro (Casablanca, 27 January 1950 - Paris, 6 August 2008), fashion designer, daughter of Antoine Navarro (Melilla, 29 January 1922 - Marseille, 12 August 1989), who fought in the French Foreign Legion, and wife Rachel Wazana (Casablanca, 19 July 1929), of Moroccan Jewish descent, paternal granddaughter of Francisco Navarro and wife Carmela Padia and maternal granddaughter of Charles Wazana and wife Fanny ... (? - Casablanca, 15 October 1938). Together they raised a family at Les Lilas, France: 
 Princess Altinaï of Montenegro, born at Les Lilas, Seine-Saint-Denis on 27 October 1977. She married Anton Martynov on 12 May 2009. The couple has one son: 
 Nikolai Martynov (born 30 September 2009)
 Boris, Hereditary Prince of Montenegro, Grand-Duke (Voivode) of Grahovo and Zeta, born at Les Lilas on 21 January 1980. He married Véronique Haillot Canas da Silva on 12 May 2007. The couple has two daughters.

Honours, awards and arms

Honours

National dynastic honours
  House of Petrović-Njegoš: Grand Master of the Order of Petrović Njegoš
  House of Petrović-Njegoš: Grand Master of the Order of Prince Danilo I
  House of Petrović-Njegoš: Grand Master of the Order of Saint Peter of Cetinje

Foreign honours
 : Member of the Order of the Legion of Honour
 Italy
  Italian Republic: Red Cross Great Cross
  Italian Republic: Recipient of the Red Cross Gold Medal
  Italian Royal Family: Supreme Order of the Most Holy Annunciation
  Italian Royal Family: Grand Cross of the Royal Order of Saints Maurice and Lazarus
  Italian Royal Family: Grand Cross of the Order of Merit of Savoy 
  Two Sicilian Royal Family: Recipient of the Golden Medal of Honor of the Sacred Military Constantinian Order of Saint George
  Two Sicilian Royal Family: Grand Cross of the Royal Order of Francis I
 : Bailiff Grand Cross of Honour and Devotion of the Sovereign Military Order of Malta, 2nd Class with Band
  Grand Ducal Royal Family of Mecklenburg: Grand Cross of the House Order of the Wendish Crown
  Portuguese Royal Family: Grand Cross of the Order of the Immaculate Conception of Vila Viçosa
  Georgian Royal Family: Knight Grand Collar of the Order of the Eagle of Georgia

Awards
 Honorary citizen of Agrigento, Sicily, Italy (23 June 2007)

Coat of arms

He bears the Montenegrin Coat of Arms, which can be seen at the centre of the Flag of Montenegro. The Royal Coat of Arms is borne by the head of the Petrović Njegoš Dynasty, and differs from the family Coat of Arms.

The Constitution of 2007 maintained "the tradition" of King Nicholas I: the adopted Coat of Arms was a crowned silver eagle with the sara in one and the scepter in the other claw, and charged on its breast was a red shield with the lion passant.

The 2011 Law on the Status of the Descendants of the Petrović Njegoš Dynasty states that Nicholas "may use the heraldic symbols of the Petrović Njegoš dynasty" (Article 6).

Ancestors

See also 
 Heads of former ruling families

References

1944 births
Living people
Petrović-Njegoš dynasty
Montenegrin nobility
Pretenders to the Montenegrin throne
Princes of Montenegro
Chevaliers of the Légion d'honneur
Bailiffs Grand Cross of Honour and Devotion of the Sovereign Military Order of Malta
Knights Grand Cross of the Order of the Immaculate Conception of Vila Viçosa